The Merseyside Express was a named passenger train that ran non-stop between Euston and Liverpool Lime Street stations on the West Coast Main Line in the 1950s, typically hauled by Princess class Pacifics. Its final journey was in 1962. Lizzie, named after the future queen when she was just seven years old, has held the world record for continuous high-speed travel by any steam locomotive since 1936.

References

See also
Liverpool-Manchester lines

Named passenger trains of British Rail